Ruslan Albertovich Salei (Belarusian: Руслан Альбертавіч Салей; Russian: Руслан Альбертович Салей; November 2, 1974 – September 7, 2011) was a Belarusian professional ice hockey player. Salei played 14 seasons in the National Hockey League (NHL) for the Detroit Red Wings, Colorado Avalanche, Florida Panthers and the Mighty Ducks of Anaheim, the latter of which selected him ninth overall in the 1996 NHL Entry Draft.

Salei died on September 7, 2011, in the Lokomotiv Yaroslavl plane crash. A Yakovlev Yak-42 passenger aircraft, carrying almost the entire Lokomotiv Yaroslavl team of the Kontinental Hockey League (KHL), crashed near Yaroslavl, Russia, en route to Minsk, Belarus, to start the 2011–12 KHL season.

Playing career
Salei was selected by the Mighty Ducks of Anaheim ninth overall at the 1996 NHL Entry Draft. In 1992, prior to being selected for the Ducks, Salei played in his native Belarus for Dinamo Minsk in the Russian Elite League. After the 1994–95 season, the Russian Elite League re-aligned, pushing Tivali Minsk to the side. Salei then came to North America, being signed by general manager Bob Strumm of the Las Vegas Thunder without Strumm knowing of his capabilities.

During a successful spell with the Thunder, Salei was drafted by the Ducks and soon signed a three-year contract worth $2.25 million. Salei split time between the Ducks, Baltimore Bandits and the Cincinnati Mighty Ducks of the American Hockey League (AHL) before becoming a full squad member of the Ducks by the end of the 1997–98 season.

In October 1999, Salei was suspended by the NHL for ten games after he checked Dallas Stars center Mike Modano face first into the boards from behind. Modano suffered a slight concussion, strained ligaments in his neck and a broken nose. Salei played in all 21 of Anaheim's games in the 2003 Stanley Cup playoffs, which saw the Ducks advance to the Stanley Cup Finals, only to lose in seven games to the New Jersey Devils. Salei scored the overtime game-winning goal in Game 3 of that series.

During the 2004–05 NHL lockout, Salei played in the Russian Superleague (RSL) for AK Bars Kazan. He returned to the Ducks upon resumption of the NHL the following season and played with the Ducks until the end of the 2005–06 season, playing 594 regular season games in his career for Anaheim, the franchise record for a defenceman (since surpassed by Cam Fowler).

On July 2, 2006, Salei signed a four-year, $12 million contract with the Florida Panthers. He quickly settled with the Panthers with his most productive season in 2006–07, totalling 32 points (6 goals and 26 assists) in 82 regular season games. He continued his new-found offensive production in 2007–08, and as the Panthers fell out of contention for the 2008 playoffs, on February 26, 2008, Salei was traded at the NHL trade deadline to the Colorado Avalanche in exchange for Kārlis Skrastiņš and a third-round draft pick.

As a veteran and in his first full season with the Avalanche in 2008–09, Salei finished second among defencemen with 21 points in 70 games. He appeared in his 800th career NHL game against the St. Louis Blues on January 15, 2009 and surpassed 1,000 career penalty minutes against the Minnesota Wild on March 12, 2009. Ruslan suffered a back injury to start the 2009–10 season, forcing him to miss 56 games. He was able to recover in time to lead Belarus in the 2010 Winter Olympics in Vancouver, but was relegated as a reserve defenceman upon his return to the Avalanche, playing in a career-low 14 games.

On August 9, 2010, the Detroit Red Wings announced that it had signed Salei as a free agent to a one-year, $750,000 contract worth an additional $350,000 in potential performance bonuses. According to Red Wings general manager Ken Holland, Salei's positive experiences under then Red Wings head coach Mike Babcock (Salei's former head coach in Anaheim) contributed to his decision. Salei scored two goals paired with eight assists during that season, as well as one goal during the 2011 playoffs in Detroit's first-round matchup against the Phoenix Coyotes.

On July 5, 2011, Salei signed a one-year contract with Lokomotiv Yaroslavl of the Kontinental Hockey League (KHL).

Death

On September 7, 2011, at 4:02 PM local time, a Yakovlev Yak-42 passenger aircraft, carrying nearly the entire Lokomotiv Yaroslavl hockey team, crashed near Yaroslavl, Russia, en route to Minsk, Belarus, to begin the 2011–12 season. Of the 45 passengers and crew on board, 44 were killed, including Salei.

Awards
 Belarus player of the year (2003, 2004)
 IIHF Hall of Fame inductee (2014)

Career statistics

Regular season and playoffs

International

See also
List of ice hockey players who died during their playing career

References

External links 
 
 

1974 births
2011 deaths
Ak Bars Kazan players
Baltimore Bandits players
Belarusian ice hockey defencemen
Cincinnati Mighty Ducks players
Colorado Avalanche players
Detroit Red Wings players
Expatriate ice hockey players in Russia
Florida Panthers players
HC Dinamo Minsk players
HK Neman Grodno players
Ice hockey players at the 1998 Winter Olympics
Ice hockey players at the 2002 Winter Olympics
Ice hockey players at the 2010 Winter Olympics
IIHF Hall of Fame inductees
Las Vegas Thunder players
Anaheim Ducks draft picks
Mighty Ducks of Anaheim players
National Hockey League first-round draft picks
Olympic ice hockey players of Belarus
Soviet ice hockey defencemen 
Ice hockey people from Minsk
Tivali Minsk players
Victims of the Lokomotiv Yaroslavl plane crash
Belarusian expatriate sportspeople in the United States
Belarusian expatriate sportspeople in Russia
Belarusian expatriate ice hockey people
Expatriate ice hockey players in the United States